Barbara Rittner and María Vento-Kabchi were the defending champions, but Rittner did not compete this year. Vento-Kabchi teamed up with Angelique Widjaja and lost in semifinals to tournament winners Svetlana Kuznetsova and Martina Navratilova.

Svetlana Kuznetsova and Martina Navratilova won the title by defeating Cara Black and Elena Likhovtseva 6–3, 7–6(9–7) in the final.

Seeds

Draw

Draw

References
 Main and Qualifying Draws

2003 Dubai Tennis Championships and Duty Free Women's Open
2003 WTA Tour